Taian Taishan Investment Co., Ltd. is a Chinese sovereign wealth fund of Tai'an, Shandong Province. The sole shareholder of the company was Tai'an Finance Bureau (since 2014, in the past Tai'an's State-owned Assets Supervision and Administration Commission).

Subsidiaries
 Taian Fund Investment & Guaranty (100%)

Equity investments

 Taian Bank (30.01% combined)
 Bank of Communications (0.03%)
 China National Materials (8.67%)

Former portfolio
 Puhua Investment (20.00%)

References

Companies owned by the provincial government of China
Companies based in Shandong
Chinese companies established in 2006